Blaž Kavčič was the defending champion, but chose not to compete.

Luca Vanni won the tournament, defeating Grega Žemlja in the final, 6–3, 7–6(8–6).

Seeds

  Marcel Granollers (first round)
  Paolo Lorenzi (quarterfinals)
  Kimmer Coppejans (first round)
  Lukáš Lacko (second round)
  Norbert Gombos (semifinals)
  Luca Vanni (champion)
  Thiemo de Bakker (second round)
  Mirza Bašić (quarterfinals)

Draw

Finals

Top half

Bottom half

References
 Main Draw
 Qualifying Draw

Tilia Slovenia Open - Singles
2015 Singles